Jace Lavoer Salter (born January 10, 2003), known professionally as iayze or Jace! (pronounced as "Jace"), is an American rapper from Fort Worth, Texas. He is better known for his song 556 (Green Tip) which received traction on TikTok. He is signed to Geffen/Interscope.

Career

2016: Beginnings
Salter would begin recording music at age 13, but claims to only have started taking it seriously with the birth of his daughter.

2021–2022: Breakthrough
In 2021, Salter started releasing multiple mixtapes and extended plays before gaining traction after his song "C'mere" went viral on YouTube and TikTok. In January 2022, he appeared on late rapper PnB Rock's mixtape SoundCloud Daze before releasing the track "556 (Green Tip)" the following month. The song also went viral on TikTok, with multiple jokes being made about its instrumental. The song served as the lead single for his debut studio album Virtuous, which released in March and contained two features from Louisiana rapper Summrs. Salter would release another album later that year, Demons 2, a sequel to a mixtape he released in 2021.

2023–present: Reverence
On March 7, 2023, Iayze released his debut full-length studio album, titled Reverence. It follows the release of his two commercial mixtapes, Virtuous and Monarch 2, released in March 2022 and January 2023 respectively.

Discography

Studio albums

Mixtape

References

External links 
 

Songwriters from Texas
Living people
American male rappers
2003 births
Rappers from Texas